Thomas Pink Limited is a British shirt-maker. It was established in London in 1984 by three Irish brothers – James, Peter and John Mullen. From 1999 it was part of the Louis Vuitton Moët Hennessy group. In 2018 it lost £23.5 million. The company changed its name to Pink Shirtmaker in November 2018, and it was put up for sale in December 2020. It closed in January 2021, but was acquired in February and had resumed trading by November.

History 

The company was started in 1984 by three Irish brothers – James, Peter and John Mullen. It was named after Thomas Pink, an eighteenth-century tailor in Mayfair, London.

In 1999, it was sold to Louis Vuitton Moët Hennessy, which paid about €48 million for 70% of the company. At the time, the company had 20 shops, including 17 in the UK, one in Dublin and two in the United States. LVMH bought the remaining 30% of the company in 2003.

In 2012, Thomas Pink launched legal proceedings in the UK against Victoria's Secret, which was marketing lingerie under the label "Pink"; Thomas Pink claimed Victoria's Secret was infringing on its trademarks, confusing customers and tarnishing its image pursuant to the Trade Marks Act 1994. Although Victoria's Secret attempted to raise a number of defences including revocation for non-use, and attacking the validity of the marks for descriptiveness and lack of distinctiveness, in July 2014 in the High Court of England and Wales Judge Colin Birss ruled in Thomas Pink's favour. Victoria's Secret, which is owned by L Brands, is making efforts to protect its trademarks in the United States, where the British trademark ruling did not have any effect.

In 2018, the company made an operating loss of £23.5 million. In November 2018, it changed its name to Pink Shirtmaker. It closed its Jermyn Street shop in August 2020, and in December of that year closed down its other shops, its website and its social media activity. Its dissolution was partially attributed to the COVID-19 pandemic. In February 2021, Nick Preston, a former JD Sports executive, made arrangements to acquire the brand and its intellectual property from LVMH, though not its retail storefronts; the brand resumed trading in November of that year.

References

1984 in London
British companies established in 1984
Clothing brands of the United Kingdom
Clothing retailers of the United Kingdom
LVMH brands
Shirts